Delphi Falls is a two-tiered waterfall located in the  Delphi Falls Park on the East Branch of Limestone Creek southeast of Delphi Falls and west-southwest of Union. In 2018 the land, which had been privately owned and closed to the public for around fifty years, was purchased with contributions from a retired professor at Syracuse University who lived in Manlius, New York, (contribution of $750,000) and the Madison County government(contribution of $150,000). 

Delphi Falls County Park was developed and opened in August 2018. In 2018 Madison County was awarded a $500,000 grant for park improvements. The park was closed for a week in July 2020 after repeated violations of park rules. It is often used for wedding photographs, drone filmography, or picnicking. In July 2022 a two-phase program of improvements was announced, scheduled to be completed by October that year. It includes the construction of a new parking lot, a new bridge below the falls, and further trail development. The cost was estimated at $1.3 million, including $1 million of state grants.

References 

Waterfalls of New York (state)